Guojiaying railway station is a station of Jingbao Railway in Inner Mongolia.

See also

List of stations on Jingbao railway

Railway stations in Inner Mongolia